This page lists the World Best Year Performance in the year 2001 in both the men's and the women's hammer throw. The main event during this season were the 2001 World Athletics Championships in Edmonton, Alberta, Canada, where the final of the men's competition was held on Sunday August 5, 2001. The women had their final two days later, on Tuesday August 7, 2001.

Men

Records

2001 World Year Ranking

Women

Records

2001 World Year Ranking

References
tilastopaja
apulanta
apulanta
IAAF
hammerthrow.wz

2001
Hammer Throw Year Ranking, 2001